Addison Bain is a retired NASA scientist and founding member of the National Hydrogen Association who is credited with postulating the Incendiary Paint Theory (IPT), which posits that the Hindenburg disaster was caused by the electrical ignition of lacquer- and metal-based paints used on the outer hull of the airship. Thus Bain believes that the hydrogen in the airship had no part to play in the initiation of the disaster. This theory, which was proposed in 1997 and recently updated in his 2004 book, The Freedom Element: Living with Hydrogen, has been generally accepted by people interested in promoting hydrogen as a transportation fuel, and generally rejected by people involved with airships and their history.

Bain attended Flathead High School, received his Bachelor of Science in space technology from Florida Institute of Technology (FIT), his Master of Science in systems management from FIT, and his Ph.D. in engineering management from CCU.

The primary refutation is based on the work of A. J. Dessler, D. E. Overs, and W. H. Appleby.
Their work, both theoretical and experimental, has concluded that even if the airship were covered with solid rocket fuel, as the Incendiary Paint Theory claims, it would still have taken 12 hours for the airship to burn had hydrogen not been present. It is worth noting that this refutation misses the point of the theory, which relates only to what started the fire, not how it continued.

The case for the Incendiary Paint Theory is explained in Bain's televised demonstration of the extreme flammability of a piece of the actual skin of the Hindenburg preserved from the disaster. Bain demonstrates the incendiary properties of the Hindenburg skin and then asks why the bits of skin ejected from the inferno continued to burn brightly on their way down instead of self-extinguishing once removed from the zone of densest hydrogen. This question of "self-extinguishing" is important, since his critics point out that the components of the doping compound used on the skin should put themselves out if removed from any fuel for fire, and should not have burned so quickly if the fire actually started with the skin instead of the hydrogen.

Critics also counter that Bain did not actually ignite the skin with a quick electrical charge but instead uses a Jacob's Ladder with continuous electrical charge, which required several strikes to ignite. Additionally, Bain was required to correctly position the fabric to allow it to ignite. Another part of the IPT hypothesizes that the mooring cables, which were designed to ground any static electricity on the surface of the airship, worked only partly in this instance; since some of the skin panels still carried an electric charge, at least one of them must have sparked, causing the initial outbreak of fire. Thus it has yet to be proven that an electrical charge could ignite the Hindenburg skin. The design of the ship would likely exclude the skin being an ignition point due to the properties of the doping process, the insulation from the frame and skin of the grounding drop-lines, and the inability of any experiment to ignite the skin via electric spark consistent with the conditions of the 1937 disaster.

The television show MythBusters also dedicated the opening episode for their 2007 season to Bain's theory. Scale models of the Hindenburg were built and tested with skin reproductions. One model had no hydrogen while the other did. The only burn that replicated the Hindenburg burn used hydrogen.

Bibliography

References 

 "The hydrogen technology assessment, phase 1", 1991, NASA Technical Reports Server
 "An assessment of the government liquid hydrogen requirements for the 1995-2005 time frame including addendum, liquid hydrogen production and commercial demand in the United States",1990, NASA Technical Reports Server
 "An assessment of the government liquid hydrogen requirements for the 1995-2005 time frame",1990, MASA Technical Reports Server

External links 
Myths about the Hindenburg Disaster
Refutation and Discussion of Dessler, Overs, and Appleby
The Hindenburg Hydrogen Fire: Fatal Flaws in the Addison Bain Incendiary Paint Theory June 3, 2004

NASA people
Florida Institute of Technology alumni
Year of birth missing (living people)
Living people
Place of birth missing (living people)
Hydrogen economy
LZ 129 Hindenburg